Alessandria railway station serves the city and comune of Alessandria, in the Piedmont region, northwestern Italy.  Opened in 1850, it forms part of the Turin–Genoa railway, and is also a junction for six other lines, to Chivasso, Piacenza, Novara, Pavia, Cavallermaggiore, Ovada and San Giuseppe di Cairo, respectively.

The station is currently managed by Rete Ferroviaria Italiana (RFI).  However, the commercial area of the passenger building is managed by Centostazioni.  Train services are operated by Trenitalia.  Each of these companies is a subsidiary of Ferrovie dello Stato (FS), Italy's state-owned rail company.

History
The station was opened on 1 January 1850, upon the inauguration of the Asti–Alessandria–Novi Ligure section of the Turin–Genoa railway.

Passenger and train movements
The station has around 6.5 million passenger movements each year.  There are about 339 trains per day.

The trains stopping at Alessandria are InterCity, express and regional trains. Their main destinations are Turin, Genoa and Novara.

Interchange
The station is also a major interchange with the urban and suburban bus lines operated by AMAG Mobilità, and suburban bus lines operated by Arfea.

See also

 History of rail transport in Italy
 List of railway stations in Piedmont
 Rail transport in Italy
 Railway stations in Italy

References

External links

This article is based upon a translation of the Italian language version as at December 2010.

Alessandria
Railway stations in Piedmont
Railway stations opened in 1850
Buildings and structures in Alessandria
Railway stations in Italy opened in 1850